"Strange Timez" is a song by British virtual band Gorillaz featuring The Cure frontman, Robert Smith. The track was released on 9 September 2020 as the seventh single for Gorillaz' seventh studio album, Song Machine, Season One: Strange Timez, and the sixth episode of the Song Machine project, a web series that involves the ongoing release of various Gorillaz tracks featuring different guest musicians over the course of 2020.

Background
The song was first teased at the end of the "Pac-Man" music video, where the opening tune of the song played over an announcement that Song Machine would return in September. It is the first single from Song Machine to be recorded during the COVID-19 pandemic, with Albarn mentioning that the track was recorded over email with Smith.

Music video
The video, directed by Jamie Hewlett, Tim McCourt, and Max Taylor, features the band members going on a trip to the Moon. 2-D stares at the Earth, Noodle blows up a billboard on the Moon, Russel performs donuts with the vehicle on the Moon's surface, and Murdoc discovers a Monolith on the Moon. When he stepped through it, it teleported him back to Earth, right outside of Kong Studios. The video ends with the message "Be the Change" written out of craters on the Moon's surface.

Track listing

Personnel
Gorillaz
 Damon Albarn – vocals, instrumentation, director, keyboards, bass
 Jamie Hewlett – artwork, character design, video direction
 Remi Kabaka Jr. – drum programming, percussion

Additional musicians and personnel
 Robert Smith – vocals, guitar, keyboards, bass guitar, music box
 Etta Albarn Teulon – trumpet
 John Davis – mastering engineer
 Samuel Egglenton – engineering
 Stephen Sedgwick – mixing engineer, engineering

References

2020 songs
2020 singles
Gorillaz songs
Songs written by Damon Albarn
Songs written by Remi Kabaka Jr.
Songs written by Robert Smith (musician)
Parlophone singles
Warner Records singles
Song Machine
Electropop songs
Post-punk songs
British synth-pop songs